Syam Pushkaran (born 6 September 1984) is an Indian scriptwriter who works in Malayalam cinema. He is known for his collaboration with directors Aashiq Abu and Dileesh Pothan. He made his debut with Salt N' Pepper (2011), co-written with Dileesh Nair. He has written screenplays for popular films such as 22 Female Kottayam (2012), Da Thadiya (2012), Idukki Gold (2013), Iyobinte Pusthakam (2014), Rani Padmini (2015), Maheshinte Prathikaaram (2016),  Mayaanadhi (2017), and Kumbalangi Nights (2019) and Joji (2021) . He also served as co-director and wrote the dialogues for Thondimuthalum Driksakshiyum (2017). Pushkaran won the National Film Award for Best Screenplay for Maheshinte Prathikaram at the 64th National Film Awards (2016).

Personal life 

He is married to Unnimaya Prasad from 2012.

Film career 
Syam Pushkaran penned the script for Salt N' Pepper along with Dileesh Nair. In 2012, he wrote the script for Da Thadiya (2012); another film directed by Aashiq Abu, along with Dileesh Nair and Abhilash S Kumar. He wrote Sethulakshmi (Segment) in the anthology film 5 Sundarikal. He was also the writer for another Aashiq Abu film Idukki Gold (2012).

Filmography

Awards

References

External links 

Malayalam screenwriters
Indian male screenwriters
Living people
People from Alappuzha district
Screenwriters from Kerala
Best Original Screenplay National Film Award winners
1984 births